Texas Hill may mean:

A summit or ridge

Arizona
 Texas Hill (Arizona) a summit in Yuma County, Arizona

California
 Texas Hill (El Dorado County, California) a Ridge
 Texas Hill (Mariposa County, California) a Summit
 Texas Hill (Placer County, California) a Summit
 Texas Hill (San Bernardino County, California) a Summit
 Texas Hill (Yuba County, California) a Summit

Florida
 Texas Hill (Jefferson County, Florida) a Summit

New Mexico
 Texas Hill (Eddy County, New Mexico) a Summit

New York
 Texas Hill (Columbia County, New York) a Summit
 Texas Hill (Madison County, New York) a Summit

Utah
 Texas Hill (Wayne County, Utah) a Summit

Vermont
 Texas Hill (Chittenden County, Vermont) a Summit